Piya Ka Ghar was a Hindi TV serial that aired on Zee TV from 2 December 2002 to 10 February 2006.

Concept
The story is based on the life of a 21-year-old young girl Rimjhim who is pretty, elegant, and soft-spoken but quick-witted and full of fun. Rimjhim, who lives in a small town, dreams of marrying someone who will love and cherish her. Her childhood friend is Avinash and their families engage them when they are kids. However, shortly after, Avinash and his family move to Mumbai.

Years later, a grown-up Rimjhim arrives in Mumbai to reconnect with Avinash and find true love.

Cast

 Narayani Shastri as Rimjhim Avinash Sharma / Megha Sharma (before plastic surgery)
 Gargi Sharma as Megha Sharma (after plastic surgery), Rimjhim's daughter
 Vishal Puri / Sanjay Mitra as Avinash Sharma 
 Alok Nath as Bhavanishankar Sharma, Avinash's father
 Suhasini Mulay / Smita Jaykar / Beena Banerjee / Suhasini Mulay as Iravati Bhavanishankar Sharma, Avinash's mother
 Sulabha Arya as Indu Sharma, Bhavani's sister
 Smita Bansal / Sonia Kapoor as Shweta Avinash Sharma, Avinash's second wife
 Kuldeep Mallik as Rakesh Sharma 
 Prachi Shah as Yashoda Rakesh Sharma 
 Amit Dolawat as Soham Sharma, Yashoda and Rakesh's son
 Bakul Thakkar as Prateek Sharma 
 Priyanka as Kaveri Prateek Sharma 
 Madhuri Sanjeev / Kannu Gill as Naina, Kaveri's mother
 Sajni Hanspal as Jayanti Sharma
 Imran Khan as Inder, Jayanti's husband
 Kamya Panjabi as Simran
 Raj Logani as Garv 
 Siraj Mustafa Khan as Vishal (Vicky) Sharma, Kaveri and Prateek's son
 Vineeta Thakur as Esha Vishal Sharma, Vicky's wife
 Hoshang Govil as Inder, Jayanti's husband
 Aashka Goradia as Chandni
 Vishal Kaushik as Om Sharma, Rakesh and Yashoda's elder son
 Narendra Gupta as Durgashankar Sharma, Bhavani's brother
 Kishwer Merchant / Amita Chandekar as Malini Avinash Sharma 
 Rushad Rana as Sameer, Rimjhim's friend
 Hrishikesh Pandey as Dr. Anurag, Rimjhim's doctor friend and Jayanti's second husband
 Gaurav Chopra as Prem Malhotra (was to be married to Megha)
 Sushmita Mukherjee as Urmila Sharma, Bhavani's daughter
 Aashish Kaul as Munna, Urmila's son
 Kamini Khanna as Munna's wife
 Achint Kaur as Amba, Rimjhim's saviour
 Aman Verma as Raj, Esha's Father
 Akhil Ghai as Rohit
 Vishal Watwani as Soham Sharma, Yashoda and Rakesh's son
 Kanika Maheshwari as Manthara Sharma 
 Sandeep Bhansali as Mahan Sharma 
 Raymon Singh as Tanya Suri / Tanya Om Sharma 
 Supriya Karnik as Mohini Suri, Tanya's mother
 Geetanjali Mishra as Nurse 
 Kiran Bhargava as Bua Ji, Bhavanishankar's sister
 Adi Irani as Nikhil
 Phalguni Parekh as Sonia
 Kavita Kaushik
 Karan Grover
 Manini Mishra as Rajeshwari
 Rakesh Srivastav as Maharaj
 Sunil Jaitley as Mr. Khan

References

External links

Zee TV original programming
Indian television soap operas
2003 Indian television series debuts
2006 Indian television series endings